2006–07 Belarusian Cup was the 16th edition of the football knock-out competition in Belarus.

First round
15 teams from the Second League (out of 17, excluding two teams which were reserve squads for Premier and First League teams), 10 teams from the First League (out of 14) and 3 amateur clubs started in this round. The games were played on 2 and 5 July 2006.

4 First League clubs received a bye to the Round of 32: Zvezda-BGU Minsk (relegated from the Premier League after 2005 season), Mozyr-ZLiN (a merger of Slavia Mozyr who relegated from Premier League and ZLiN Gomel, who finished 4th in 2005 First League), Smorgon (3rd place in 2005 First League) and Minsk, a new club which took over the licence from Smena Minsk (5th in 2005 First League).

Round of 32
14 winners of previous round were joined by 14 clubs from Premier League and four First League clubs who received a bye to this round. The games were played on 10 and 13 August 2006.

Round of 16
The games were played as two-legged ties. The first legs were played on 20 September 2006. The second legs were played on 4 October 2006.

|}

First leg

Second leg

Quarterfinals
The first legs were played on April 1, 2007. The second legs were played on April 5, 2007.

|}

First leg

Second leg

Semifinals
The first legs were played on April 10, 2007. The second legs were played on May 2, 2007.

|}

First leg

Second leg

Final

External links
RSSSF

Belarusian Cup seasons
Belarusian Cup
Cup
Cup